The knockout stage of the 2019 Rugby World Cup began on 19 October and concluded on 2 November with the final at the International Stadium Yokohama in Yokohama, Japan.

Qualified teams
England became the first team to qualify for the knock-out stage of the World Cup, with a game in hand, after winning their opening three games of the pool stage. France became the second team to qualify for the last eight to complete the two teams that advanced out of Pool C. South Africa secured their spot in the quarter-finals after their final pool match victory over Canada. After the match cancellations, New Zealand confirmed their place in the quarter-finals as pool winners. Wales confirmed their place in the quarter-finals with a game in hand after their win over Fiji; that result also confirmed Australia's advancement to the knock-out stage. Ireland secured their progression to the quarter-finals following their victory over Samoa in their final match. In the last pool stage match, home team Japan secured their top place in Pool A by beating Scotland and advanced to the quarter-finals for the first time in World Cup history.

Bracket

Quarter-finals

England vs Australia

Notes:
Jonny May (England) earned his 50th test cap.
This was Australia's largest Rugby World Cup defeat, surpassing the 17-point loss against New Zealand in the 2015 final, as well as the most points they had conceded in a World Cup match, and the highest scoring match between these teams in a World Cup.

New Zealand vs Ireland

Notes:
This was Ireland's largest defeat in a World Cup match surpassing their 43–19 defeat to New Zealand in 1995.

Wales vs France

Notes:
Jonathan Davies was due to start in this game, but withdrew ahead of kick-off due to injury. Owen Watkin replaced Davies in the starting XV with Leigh Halfpenny taking Watkin's place on the bench.

Japan vs South Africa

Semi-finals

England vs New Zealand

Notes:
Billy Vunipola (England) and Codie Taylor (New Zealand) earned their 50th test caps.
This was New Zealand's first Rugby World Cup loss since losing to France 20–18 in the 2007 Rugby World Cup quarter-final.	
This was England's first win over New Zealand in a Rugby World Cup match, their first win since defeating them 38–21 in 2012, and their first win away from Twickenham since a 15−13 win in Wellington in 2003.
New Zealand failed to score in the first half of a World Cup match for the first time since their 16–6 defeat to Australia in the 1991 World Cup semi-final, and for the first time in any match since England beat them 38–21 in December 2012.
Measured by points deficit, this result equaled New Zealand's biggest ever World Cup defeat, matching the 12-point losses to France in the 1999 World Cup semi-final (43-31) and to Australia in the 2003 World Cup semi-final (22-10).
This victory meant England climbed to the top of the World Rugby rankings for the first time since 2004. It also meant New Zealand dropped to third, equalling their lowest position since the rankings were introduced.

Wales vs South Africa

Notes:
Gareth Davies (Wales) earned his 50th test cap.

Bronze final: New Zealand vs Wales

Final: England vs South Africa

Notes:
Siya Kolisi (South Africa) earned his 50th test cap.
François Steyn (South Africa) became the second Springbok player to win two World Cups.
Jérôme Garcès became the first French referee to take charge of a Rugby World Cup final.
South Africa became the first Southern Hemisphere team to win The Rugby Championship (previously the Tri Nations) and the Rugby World Cup in the same year.
South Africa became the first team to win the Rugby World Cup having lost a match during the pool stage.
This was the first final in which South Africa scored a try, and the one in which they scored the most points, more than they had in their previous two finals combined. It was also the most points England had scored in a final when finishing on the losing side.
England and South Africa became the third pair of nations to face each other on two separate occasions in a World Cup final (previously having contested the 2007 final) after England and Australia (1991 and 2003) and France and New Zealand (1987 and 2011).
South Africa came into the match as the only nation to have contested at least one World Cup final to have never lost in the final - this remains the case.

References

External links
World Rugby official site

knockout stage
2019–20 in Japanese rugby union
World Cup
World Cup
World Cup
World Cup
World Cup
World Cup
World Cup